p21-activated protein kinase-interacting protein 1 is an enzyme that in humans is encoded by the PAK1IP1 gene.

Interactions
PAK1IP1 has been shown to interact with PAK1.

References

Further reading